Emma Green is an American journalist and writer for The New Yorker. In November 2021, she was named a staff writer for the magazine, covering topics of academia and cultural conflicts in education. Green formerly worked as a staff writer and managing editor for The Atlantic, where she covered religion and politics. She has won several awards for her writing, including Religion News Association's first-place award in religion-news analysis in 2018, and the 2020 George W. Hunt, S.J., Prize for Journalism. Green graduated from Georgetown University in 2012.

References

Living people
Date of birth missing (living people)
Georgetown University alumni
Philodemic Society members
Year of birth missing (living people)